The Hotel Manor Inn is a 1997 American film written and directed by Wayne Chesler and starring John Randolph, Sam Trammell, Burke Moses and Jennifer Corby.

Cast
John Randolph as Gus
Sam Trammell as Nolan
Burke Moses as Brian Armor
Jennifer Corby as Kathy
Fred Norris as Pete
Richard Bright as Gregor
William Preston as Charlie
Jessica Dublin as Lucille
Lawrence Vincent as Ed
Herschel Sparber as Chief Farrell
Jack William Scott
Jane Strauss as Holly Wiley
Steve Roberts

Release
The film was released at the Quad Cinema on March 28, 1997.

Reception
Stephen Holden of The New York Times gave the film a negative review and wrote, "This hopelessly flat, unfunny spoof of tabloid television and hotel management doesn't even generate a tingle."

Lisa Nesselson of Variety gave the film a positive review and wrote, "Creepy and offbeat enough to sustain interest without devolving into gratuitous violence or gore, this low-key horror pic is at least as suspenseful as the remake of Diabolique, although the body count is higher."

References

External links
 

1990s English-language films